The Local Governance (Scotland) Act 2004 (asp 9) is an Act of the Scottish Parliament which provided, amongst other things, for the election of councillors to the local authorities in Scotland by the single transferable vote system.

The Commission on Local Government and the Scottish Parliament reported in June 2000. The introduction of proportional representation in local authority elections was a key demand of the Liberal Democrats when they entered into coalition with the Labour Party in the Scottish Executive.

See also
 2007 Scottish local government elections

References

External links

Acts of the Scottish Parliament 2004
Local government in Scotland
 
Local government legislation in the United Kingdom